Sagittaria macrophylla, common name papa de agua, is an aquatic plant species endemic to central Mexico (States of Jalisco, Michoacán, México, Hidalgo, and the Distrito Federal), primarily in the region close to the nation's capital. It grows in clean, shallow, slow-moving water. It is considered threatened by habitat destruction due to urbanization.

Sagittaria macrophylla produces underground tubers that are starchy and edible. These tubers and those of other species of Sagittaria are a traditional food source for the people of the region, referred to as "papa de agua," i.e., "water potato." It has large, hastate (arrow-shaped) leaves with blades up to 30 cm long. Terminal lobe is large and broadly lanceolate, while the two basal lobes are much smaller and narrower.

References

External links
photo of herbarium specimen at Field Museum in Chicago, collected in Distrito Federal de Mexico

macrophylla
Flora of Hidalgo (state)
Flora of Michoacán
Flora of Jalisco
Flora of Mexico
Freshwater plants
Edible plants
Plants described in 1832